Carbrook is a suburb in the City of Logan, Queensland, Australia. Carbrook was previously called Gramzow, a name of German origin.

History

Carbrook was originally known as Gramzow after the village of Gramzow, Uckermark, Northern Germany, the name being given to it by the early German settlers who arrived in 1867.

The Alberton Ferry was established 1870 to cross the Logan River between Ferry Road at Carbrook and Alberton Road at Alberton. Following the opening of the Logan Bridge in 1931, usage of the ferry declined and it was closed in 1948.

Gramzow State School opened on 5 November 1877, being renamed Carbrook State School in 1916. It relocated to its present location in 1987 with the former school building still extant and listed on the Queensland Heritage Register.

During World War I, German names were unpopular and many German- or German-sounding placenames were changed. In 1916, Gramzow's school and post office were renamed Carbrook.

Until 1949, Carbrook was within the Shire of Tingalpa.

Calvary Christian College opened on 1 February 1978.

Christian Life College opened on 5 February 1979 and closed on 16 December 1993.

Kimberley College opened in January 2000.

The Carbrook campus of the Calvary Christian College opened in 2002.

The median age of the Carbrook population was 48 years old, 10 years above the national median of 38. 78.3% of people living in Carbrook were born in Australia. The other top responses for country of birth were England (5.2%), New Zealand (3.2%), Scotland (1.1%), India (1.0)%, and the Netherlands (0.7%). 91.6% of people spoke only English at home; the next most common languages were Punjabi (1.7%), Dutch and Afrikaans (0.5% each), Italian (0.4%), and Spanish (0.3%).

Road infrastructure
The Beenleigh–Redland Bay Road runs through from west to east.

Heritage listings 
Carbrook has a number of heritage-listed sites, including:
 Mount Cotton Road: Carbrook Lutheran Cemetery
 445 - 469 Beenleigh Redland Bay Road: Fachwerk Farmhouse
 597 - 605 Beenleigh Redland Bay Road: Old Carbrook State School

Education

Carbrook State School is a government primary (Prep-6) school for boys and girls at Redland Bay Road. In 2018, the school had an enrolment of 452 students with 34 teachers (29 full-time equivalent) and 19 non-teaching staff (12 full-time equivalent). It includes a special education program.

Kimberley College is a private primary and secondary (Prep-12) school for boys and girls at 35-41 Kruger Road. In 2018, the school had an enrolment of 855 students with 60 teachers and 28 non-teaching staff (27 full-time equivalent).

Calvary Christian College is a private primary and secondary (Prep-12) school. It has two campuses, one at 559-581 Beenleigh-Redland Bay Road in Carbrook and the other in Springwood.

Carbrook Animal Assisted Learning Centre is a private secondary (7-12) special needs school at 597 - 605 Beenleigh Redland Bay Road (the Old Carbrook State School). It provides support for students who have disengaged from mainstream schooling through the use of animal therapy. 

There is no government secondary school in Carbrook. The nearest government secondary school is Shailer Park State High School in Shailer Park to the west.

Facilities 
Great Southern Memorial Park is a cemetery and crematorium at 1774-1794 Mount Cotton Road.

Wirunya Aged Care Centre is a aged care facility at 559-581 Beenleigh Redland Bay Road.

Amenities 
Fishing is popular along the Logan River. 

There is two boat ramps into the Logan River, both managed by the Logan City Council:

 at the south end of Reidel Road
 at the south end of Skinners Road

There are a number of parks in the area:

 California Creek Park
 Native Dog Creek East Park

 Native Dog Creek Park

 Skinners Park

Attractions 
The Carbrook Golf Club is at 653 Beenleigh Redland Bay Road at the confluence of the Logan River and its tributary, the Albert River. More than a dozen bull sharks inhabit a lake at the edge of the golf course, and locals claim that the sharks likely arrived there following a flood in the 1990s. The club has embraced the existence of the sharks, having adopted a shark-shaped logo and running monthly Shark Lake Challenge golf competitions.

Carbrook is home to one of three cable skiing parks in Australia. Bayside Wake Park (formerly Cable Ski Logan) is at 80 Ferry Road next to the Logan River. It is suitable for the first time kneeboarder to the experienced wakeboarder.

Aquatic Gardens Caravan Park is at  833-901 Beenleigh Redland Bay Road near the cable ski.

See also

 Australian place names changed from German names

References

External links

 
 

 
Suburbs of Logan City
Populated places established in 1867
1867 establishments in Australia